Puss n' Booty  is a 1943 Warner Bros. Looney Tunes cartoon directed by Frank Tashlin. The short was released on December 11, 1943 in the United States.

The plot of Puss n' Booty was later remade in color as 1948's I Taw a Putty Tat, starring Sylvester and Tweety.

Plot 

A pet owner comes home to find that her pet canary Dicky is gone. As she searches around, her cat Rudolph burps the feathers of Dicky, but also stages that Dicky flew out the window. Stating that's the fifth canary that flew out on her, she calls the pet shop to get her a new bird. As the delivery truck arrives, Rudolph waits outside in hopes to get another meal. He peeps inside of the cage, revealing a small bird who shivers on sight of the cat, fearing impending doom from being eaten.

The owner names the bird Petey, and gives him and Rudolph their food. However, Rudolph is disgusted with drinking milk and attempts to eat Petey.  As Rudolph leaps for the bird, Petey lifts his cage quickly, directing Rudolph into a wall. Rudolph attaches strings to the cage and attempts the same jump again, but Petey opens both doors of the cage and flies out of the way, leading Rudolph outside of the window and slamming into a fountain.

That night, Rudolph sneakily tries to nab his dinner while Petey is sleeping, but Petey smashes Rudolph's hand with a mallet and drops another one on his head. Rudolph then drops from above of the cage, ricocheting up and down repeatedly until he is flung to the door. Petey quickly escapes from the cat's mouth and flies back into his cage, which has Rudolph waiting to eat him. After a large fight that wakes up the owner, the owner finds out that Rudolph is now missing. Petey doesn't know where Rudolph is, until he hiccups out Rudolph's bow tie, but he hides it and sleeps.

Changes in the 1948 remake 
 The opening sequence is much shorter in the color remake than the original.
 Although the woman is still the same, Petey and Rudolph are replaced by the more popular Sylvester and Tweety.
 There is more slapstick and cartoon violence in the original. Also, unlike the color remake, the cat and canary do not speak.
 Sylvester counts out the number of birds he has eaten by stamps on the wall, rather than counting manually by paws like Rudolph did. Also, while Sylvester hiccupped out feathers of only one bird in the remake, Rudolph hiccuped feathers of five birds in the original.
 In the color remake, Tweety defeated Sylvester by trapping him in the cage with Hector the Bulldog. In the original, Petey fought with Rudolph in the cage and ate the cat up (in an unusual twist).

References

External links 

 

1943 films
1943 animated films
1940s animated short films
Looney Tunes shorts
Warner Bros. Cartoons animated short films
Short films directed by Frank Tashlin
American black-and-white films
Films scored by Carl Stalling
Films produced by Leon Schlesinger
1940s Warner Bros. animated short films